Alan J. Lasee (born July 30, 1937) is a retired American dairy farmer and Republican politician.  He was a member of the Wisconsin State Senate for 33 years, representing Wisconsin's 1st Senate district, and served as President of the Senate for the 96th and 97th Wisconsin legislatures (2003–2007).

Biography

Lasee was born in the town of Rockland, Brown County, Wisconsin, and attended St. Norbert High School.  He is married and has six children. He is a former dairy farmer and member of many Brown County organizations. He also raises exotic animals including llamas, camels, miniature donkeys, and fainting goats.

Lasee was elected to the Wisconsin State Assembly in 1974 and to the Wisconsin Senate in 1977 in a special election (following the death of then-senator Jerome Martin).  He was the Minority caucus chairperson in 1979, 1981 and 1987. He then was President Pro Tempore in 1993 and 1995. He became president of the senate in 2003 and in 2005.

Alan Lasee sat on the committee on Campaign Finance Reform and Ethics, the Committee on State and Federal Relations, and co-chairs both the Joint committee on Employment Relations and the Joint committee on Legislative Organization.  Throughout his legislative career, he tried to bring back the death penalty to Wisconsin, but was ultimately unsuccessful. On January 11, 2010, Senator Lasee announced his retirement from the Wisconsin Legislature. Alan's younger cousin, Frank Lasee, won this open seat in the November 2010 election.

References

External links
 
 
 2nd Senate District, Senator Lasee in the Wisconsin Blue Book (2005–2006)

Presidents of the Wisconsin Senate
Republican Party Wisconsin state senators
Republican Party members of the Wisconsin State Assembly
1937 births
Living people
21st-century American politicians
People from Brown County, Wisconsin